Croremopsis is a monotypic moth genus in the subfamily Lymantriinae described by Hering in 1926. Its only species, Croremopsis argenna, was first described by Paul Mabille in 1900. It is found on Madagascar.

References

Lymantriinae
Monotypic moth genera